Chelsea was a borough constituency, represented in the House of Commons of the Parliament of the United Kingdom.

The constituency was created by the Reform Act 1867 for the 1868 general election, when it returned two Members of Parliament (MPs), elected by the bloc vote system of election.

Under the Redistribution of Seats Act 1885, with effect from the 1885 general election, its representation was reduced to one MP, elected by the first past the post system.

Boundaries and boundary changes
1868–1885: The parishes of Chelsea, Fulham, Hammersmith, and Kensington.

1885–1918: The parish of St Luke, Chelsea.

Chelsea (after the local government changes in 1965) is a district of Inner London, comprising for administrative purposes the southern part of the Royal Borough of Kensington and Chelsea. Its southern boundary is on the north bank of the River Thames. It adjoins Westminster to the east, Fulham to the west and Kensington to the north.

Before 1868 the area was represented in Parliament as part of the county constituency of Middlesex.

With the expansion westwards of the urban area around Westminster, the former village of Chelsea and  neighbouring areas had by 1868 developed enough to be made a Parliamentary borough and given two seats in the House of Commons. The parliamentary borough comprised four civil parishes: Chelsea, Fulham, Hammersmith and Kensington.

In 1885, the existing parliamentary borough was divided into five single-member constituencies. The Redistribution of Seats Act 1885 defined the redrawn Chelsea seat as comprising the parish of St Luke, Chelsea. The constituency had a detached outlier, the Kensal Green area, because of its history as a detached part of St Luke parish. (The remaining parishes became the constituencies of Fulham, Hammersmith, Kensington North and Kensington South.)

In 1889, the historic county of Middlesex was divided for administrative purposes. Chelsea became part of the County of London. No changes were made to parliamentary boundaries, however.

In the 1918 redistribution of Parliamentary seats, the Metropolitan Borough of Chelsea (created as a local government unit in 1900) was represented by one MP.

In the redistribution which took effect in 1950, the then Brompton ward of the Metropolitan Borough of Kensington was added to the existing area of the constituency.

In 1965, the London County Council area was absorbed by the new Greater London Council. The constituency was included in a new London Borough of Kensington and Chelsea, although the Parliamentary boundaries were not altered immediately.

In the redistribution that took effect in 1974, the Kensington and Chelsea, Chelsea constituency consisted of the then Brompton, Cheyne, Church, Earls Court, Hans Town, North Stanley, Redcliffe, Royal Hospital and South Stanley wards of Kensington and Chelsea.

From the 1983 redistribution, Chelsea consisted of Abingdon, Brompton, Cheyne, Church, Courtfield, Earls Court, Hans Town, North Stanley, Redcliffe, Royal Hospital and South Stanley wards of Kensington and Chelsea.

98.5% of the constituency had been in the pre-1983 Chelsea and 1.5% had been part of Kensington.

In the 1997 redistribution, Chelsea ceased to exist as a constituency. The area was included in the Kensington and Chelsea constituency, which covered the central and southern portions of the Royal Borough of Kensington and Chelsea, including the centres of both Kensington and Chelsea.

Members of Parliament

MPs 1868–1885

MPs 1885–1997

Elections

Elections in the 1990s
 Constituency abolished 1997

Elections in the 1980s

 Minor boundary change affecting less than 5% of electors

Elections in the 1970s

 Boundary change

Elections in the 1960s

Elections in the 1950s

Elections in the 1940s

 Note 1 (1945): Changes and swing calculated from 1935 to 1945.
 Note 2 (1945): Counting of votes took place on 26 July 1945
 Boundary change
 Creation of Hoare as 1st Viscount Templewood

Elections in the 1930s

Elections in the 1920s

Elections in the 1910s

Elections in the 1900s

Elections in the 1890s

Elections in the 1880s

 Constituency reduced to one seat.
 Swing: For 1885–1910 the swing figure given is the Butler Swing, defined as the average of the Conservative % gain and Liberal % loss between two elections, with the percentages being calculated on the basis of the total number of votes (including those cast for candidates other than Conservative or Liberal). A positive figure is a swing to Conservative and a negative one to Liberal.

 Caused by the appointment of Dilke as President of the Local Government Board 

 Elections in the 1870s

 Elections in the 1860s

 
 

 See also 
 List of parliamentary constituencies in London
 Duration of English, British and United Kingdom parliaments from 1660

References

 Who's Who of British Members of Parliament: Volume I 1832-1885, edited by M. Stenton (The Harvester Press 1976)
 British Parliamentary Election Results 1832-1885, compiled and edited by F. W. S. Craig (The Macmillan Press 1977)
 British Parliamentary Election Results 1885-1918, compiled and edited by F. W. S. Craig (The Macmillan Press 1974)
 British Parliamentary Election Results 1918-1949, compiled and edited by F. W. S. Craig (The Macmillan Press 1977)
 British Parliamentary Election Results 1950-1973, compiled and edited by F. W. S. Craig (Parliamentary Research Services 1983)
 British Parliamentary Election Results 1974-1983, compiled and edited by F. W. S. Craig (Parliamentary Research Services 1984)
 Britain Votes 4: British Parliamentary Election Results 1983-1987, compiled and edited by F. W. S. Craig (Parliamentary Research Services 1988)
 Britain Votes 5: British Parliamentary Election Results 1988-1992, compiled and edited by Colin Rallings and Michael Thrasher (Parliamentary Research Services/Dartmouth Publishing 1993)
 Boundaries of Parliamentary Constituencies 1885-1972, compiled and edited by F. W. S. Craig (Political Reference Publications 1972)
 British Parliamentary Constituencies: A Statistical Compendium'', by Ivor Crewe and Anthony Fox (Faber and Faber 1984)

Politics of the Royal Borough of Kensington and Chelsea
Parliamentary constituencies in London (historic)
Constituencies of the Parliament of the United Kingdom established in 1868
Constituencies of the Parliament of the United Kingdom disestablished in 1997
Political history of Middlesex
Chelsea, London